The Virginia Landmarks Register (VLR) is a list of historic properties in the Commonwealth of Virginia.  The state's official list of important historic sites, it was created in 1966.  The Register serves the same purpose as the National Register of Historic Places. The nomination form for any Virginia site listed on the VLR is sent forward to the National Park Service for consideration for listing on the National Register.

The Virginia Landmarks Register is maintained by the Virginia Department of Historic Resources.

List of Virginia Landmarks

Almost all of the over 2800 sites listed on the national register are also listed on the state register. For those listings see: National Register of Historic Places listings in Virginia.

Virginia register only

The following are listed on the Virginia register, but not the national register:

See also
List of National Historic Landmarks in Virginia
National Register of Historic Places listings in Virginia
Virginia Historic Landmark

References

External links
Virginia Department of Historic Resources: Virginia Landmarks Register — & National Register of Historic Places in Virginia.

 01
 
.
Lists of buildings and structures in Virginia
.
1966 establishments in Virginia